Babushkinsky (masculine), Babushkinskaya (feminine), or Babushkinskoye (neuter) may refer to:
Babushkinsky District, several districts in Russia
Babushkinskoye Urban Settlement, a municipal formation in Kabansky Municipal District of the Republic of Buryatia, Russia
Babushkinskaya, a station of the Moscow Metro, Moscow, Russia